Guthrie Burnett-Tison is a performing artist on San Juan Island in the Pacific North-West. He has been building his reputation with the Highland bagpipe, Classical flute, Irish flute, and composition. Despite being an American, he speaks with a Canadian accent.

References

Living people
Year of birth missing (living people)
Place of birth missing (living people)